The 2017 Liga 2 was the inaugural season of the Liga 2 under its current name, and the eighth season under its current league structure.

Persebaya won the title after a 3–2 win over PSMS in the final at Gelora Bandung Lautan Api Stadium, Bandung on 28 November 2017.

Overview

Player regulations
Starting this season Liga 2 was an under-25 tournament (born on or after 1 January 1992), with a maximum of five overage players allowed. Teams are no longer allowed to use foreign players and were allowed to have a maximum of 30 players.

Format
The league was divided into eight groups containing 7–8 teams each. The top two teams from each group qualified for the next round, while teams ranked fifth and below were relegated to the Liga 3. This arrangement was made to reduce the large number of participants (61) in 24 teams in the 2018 season.

Teams
55 teams from the 2015 Liga Indonesia Premier Division were rejoined with four teams who pulled out from that season. Persebaya Surabaya, previously not recognized, also participated this season.

Name changes 
 Villa 2000 was changed to Celebest after moving their homebase from South Tangerang to Palu in January 2016.
 Persigo was changed to Semeru after moving their homebase from Gorontalo to Lumajang in January 2017.
 Bintang Jaya Asahan merged with YSK 757 Karimun to become 757 Kepri Jaya after moving their homebase from Asahan to Batam in February 2017.
 Persires Sukoharjo was changed to Lampung Sakti after moving their homebase from Sukoharjo to Bandar Lampung in February 2017.
 Laga was changed to Sragen United after moving their homebase from Surabaya to Sragen on 27 February 2017.
 Persebo was changed to Madura after moving their homebase from Bondowoso to Sumenep in March 2017.
 PS Bangka changed their name to PS Timah Babel in April 2017.
 Perseka changed their name to Perseka Manokwari after moving their homebase from Kaimana to Manokwari in July 2017.

Stadium and locations

Notes:

Personnel and kits
Note: Flags indicate national team as has been defined under FIFA eligibility rules. Players and coaches may hold more than one non-FIFA nationality.

Coaching changes

First round 
The first round started on 19 April 2017 with 61 teams competing.

Group 1 
On 26 July 2017, Pro Duta announced to exit from the competition after 8 matches. The other teams' results against Pro Duta was nullified

Group 2

Group 3

Group 4

Group 5

Group 6

Group 7

Group 8 
Unlike other groups who played their match on home and away basis, Group 8 was contested as a double round-robin tournament held at Gelora Delta Stadium, Sidoarjo. Persifa withdrew from the competition after the management did not submit the player list and could not be contacted in a day before their first match.

Second round
This round began on 20 September 2017 and ended on 13 October 2017. Sixteen teams competed in this round.

Group A

Group B

Group C

Group D

Third round 
The third round was divided into 2 groups. Each group was contested as a single round-robin tournament played with the home tournament format on a neutral venue. The group winners and runners-up qualified to semifinals.

Group X
Five matches were held in Patriot Chandrabhaga Stadium, Bekasi and one match was held in Singaperbangsa Stadium, Karawang
Times listed are UTC+7:00

Group Y
All matches were held in Gelora Bandung Lautan Api Stadium, Bandung
Initially this group matches were held in Wibawa Mukti Stadium, Cikarang but Bekasi Regent cancelled it after 2017 Liga 1 U-19 final riot
Times listed are UTC+7:00

Knockout round 
Knockout round was held in Gelora Bandung Lautan Api Stadium, Bandung on 25–28 November 2017. The three best teams promoted to Liga 1.

Semifinals

Third place

Final

Relegation play-off
A special play-off was held between PSBK and Persewangi to determine one slot left for relegation play-off.

This match stopped in 86' due to dissatisfaction to referee when PSBK was leading 1–0. Persewangi declared lose 0–3.

Relegation play-off round was divided into 4 groups. Each group was contested as a single round-robin tournament played with the home tournament format on a neutral venue. The group winner and one best runner-up teams were stayed in 2018 Liga 2. The drawing was held in Jakarta on 18 September 2017.

Group E 
 Five matches were held in Manahan Stadium, Solo and one match were held in Sriwedari Stadium, Solo
 Times listed are UTC+7:00

Group F 
 Five matches were held in Gelora Delta Stadium, Sidoarjo and one match was held in Bumimoro Stadium, Surabaya
 Times listed are UTC+7:00

Group G 
 Five matches were held in Wilis Stadium, Madiun and one match was held in Ketonggo Stadium, Ngawi
 Times listed are UTC+7:00

Group H 
 Five matches were held in Kanjuruhan Stadium, Malang and one match was held in Gajayana Stadium, Malang
 Times listed are UTC+7:00

Ranking of second-placed teams

Season statistics

Top scorers

See also
 2017 Liga 1
 2017 Liga 3

References

Works cited
 

Liga 2
2
Indonesia
Indonesia